Sankt Leon-Rot is a municipality in the district of Rhein-Neckar-Kreis, in Baden-Württemberg,  Germany. It is situated 16 km south of  Heidelberg.

Geographical location
Sankt Leon-Rot is located in the Kraichbach lowlands, belonging to the Upper Rhine Graben. It is part of the Rhine-Neckar metropolitan region.

References

External links
 Official Homepage

Rhein-Neckar-Kreis